International Women University or IWU is the first women's university in Indonesia. It is located in Bandung, the capital city of West Java. It is a private university, under supervision of Arena Komunikasi Bandung Foundation.

IWU is established at  February 13  2008, according to letter of establishment SKPT No. 26DO2008. It was inaugurated by State Minister for Women's Empowerment and Child Protection of the Republic of Indonesia,  
Linda Amalia Sari, to empowering Indonesian women and to
increase the number of qualified women not only in the legislature, but in all sectors, such as NGOs, executives and other institutions. For this reason, the International Women's University also organizes a double degree program.

Academics

International Women University offers undergraduate and postgraduate programs in the following disciplines:

 Faculty of science and technology
 Math
 Biology
 Chemistry
 Physics
 Informatics engineering
 Faculty of art and design
 Visual communication design
 Interior design
 Faculty of social and business
 International relations
 Politics
 Business administration
 Communication

References

External links
 

Women's universities and colleges
Education in Bandung
Universities and colleges in Indonesia